Tigrinya (also spelled Tigrigna) is an Ethio-Semitic language commonly spoken in Eritrea and in northern Ethiopia's Tigray Region by the Tigrinya and Tigrayan peoples. It is also spoken by the global diaspora of these regions.

History and literature 
Although it differs markedly from the Geʽez (Classical Ethiopic) language, for instance in having phrasal verbs, and in using a word order that places the main verb last instead of first in the sentence—there is a strong influence of Geʽez on Tigrinya literature, especially with terms relating to Christian life, Biblical names, and so on. Ge'ez, because of its status in Ethiopian culture, and possibly also its simple structure, acted as a literary medium until relatively recent times.

The earliest written example of Tigrinya is a text of local laws found in the district of Logosarda, Debub Region in Southern Eritrea, which dates from the 13th century.

In Eritrea, during British administration, the Ministry of Information put out a weekly newspaper in Tigrinya that cost 5 cents and sold 5,000 copies weekly. At the time, it was reported to be the first of its kind.

Tigrinya (along with Arabic) was one of Eritrea's official languages during its short-lived federation with Ethiopia; in 1958 it was replaced by the Southern Ethiopic language Amharic prior to its annexation. Upon Eritrea's independence in 1991, Tigrinya retained the status of working language in the country, the only state in the world, until changes were made in Ethiopia in 2020, to recognize Tigrinya on a national level.

Speakers
There is no general name for the people who speak Tigrinya. In Eritrea, Tigrinya speakers are officially known as the Bəher-Təgrəñña ("nation of Tigrinya speakers") or Tigrinya people. In Ethiopia, a Tigrayan, that is a native of Tigray, who also speaks the Tigrinya language, is referred to in Tigrinya as təgraway (male), təgrawäyti (female), tägaru (plural). Bəher roughly means "nation" in the ethnic sense of the word in Tigrinya, Tigre, Amharic and Ge'ez. The Jeberti in Eritrea also speak Tigrinya.

Tigrinya is the most widely spoken language in Eritrea (see Demographics of Eritrea), and the fourth most spoken language in Ethiopia after Amharic, Oromo, and Somali. It is also spoken by large immigrant communities around the world, in countries including Sudan, Saudi Arabia, Israel, Denmark, Germany, Italy, Sweden, the United Kingdom, Canada and the United States. In Australia, Tigrinya is one of the languages broadcast on public radio via the multicultural Special Broadcasting Service.

Tigrinya dialects differ phonetically, lexically, and grammatically. No dialect appears to be accepted as a standard.

Phonology 
For the representation of Tigrinya sounds, this article uses a modification of a system that is common (though not universal) among linguists who work on Ethiopian Semitic languages, but differs somewhat from the conventions of the International Phonetic Alphabet.

Consonant phonemes 
Tigrinya has a fairly typical set of phonemes for an Ethiopian Semitic language. That is, there is a set of ejective consonants and the usual seven-vowel system. Unlike many of the modern Ethiopian Semitic languages, Tigrinya has preserved the two pharyngeal consonants which were apparently part of the ancient Geʽez language and which, along with [x'], voiceless velar ejective fricative or voiceless uvular ejective fricative, make it easy to distinguish spoken Tigrinya from related languages such as Amharic, though not from Tigre, which has also maintained the pharyngeal consonants.

The charts below show the phonemes of Tigrinya. The sounds are shown using the same system for representing the sounds as in the rest of the article. When the IPA symbol is different, the orthography is indicated in brackets.

Vowel phonemes 
The sounds are shown using the same system for representing the sounds as in the rest of the article. When the IPA symbol is different, the orthography is indicated in brackets.

Gemination 
Gemination, the doubling of a consonantal sound, is meaningful in Tigrinya, i.e. it affects the meaning of words. While gemination plays an important role in the morphology of the Tigrinya verb, it is normally accompanied by other marks. But there is a small number of pairs of words which are only differentiable from each other by gemination, e.g. All the consonants, with the exception of the pharyngeal and glottal, can be geminated.

Allophones 
In these circumstances,  is pronounced as a velar fricative.  is pronounced as a fricative, or sometimes as an affricate. This fricative or affricate is more often pronounced further back, in the uvular place of articulation (although it is represented in this article as ). All of these possible realizations - velar ejective fricative, uvular ejective fricative, velar ejective affricate and uvular ejective affricate - are cross-linguistically very rare sounds.

This is especially clear from verb roots in which one consonant is realized as one or the other allophone depending on what precedes it.

What is especially interesting about these pairs of phones is that they are distinguished in Tigrinya orthography. Because allophones are completely predictable, it is quite unusual for them to be represented with distinct symbols in the written form of a language.

Syllables 
A Tigrinya syllable may consist of a consonant-vowel or a consonant-vowel-consonant sequence. When three consonants (or one geminated consonant and one simple consonant) come together within a word, the cluster is broken up with the introduction of an epenthetic vowel ə, and when two consonants (or one geminated consonant) would otherwise end a word, the vowel i appears after them, or (when this happens because of the presence of a suffix) ə is introduced before the suffix.
For example,

Stress is neither contrastive nor particularly salient in Tigrinya. It seems to depend on gemination, but it has apparently not been systematically investigated.

Grammar

Typical grammatical features 
Grammatically, Tigrinya is a typical Ethiopian Semitic (ES) language in most ways:
 A Tigrinya noun is treated as either masculine or feminine. However, most inanimate nouns do not have a fixed gender.
 Tigrinya nouns have plural, as well as singular, forms, though the plural is not obligatory when the linguistic or pragmatic context makes the number clear. As in Tigre and Geez (as well as Arabic), noun plurals may be formed through internal changes ("broken" plural) as well as through the addition of suffixes. For example,  färäs 'horse',  afras 'horses'.
 Adjectives behave in most ways like nouns. Most Tigrinya adjectives, like those in Tigre and Ge'ez, have feminine and plural (both genders) forms. For example,  ṣǝbbuq̱ 'good (m.sg.)',  ṣǝbbǝq̱ti 'good (f.sg.)',  ṣǝbbuq̱at 'good (pl.)'
 Within personal pronouns and subject agreement inflections on verbs, gender is distinguished in second person as well as third. For example,  täzaräb 'speak! (m.sg.)',  täzaräbi 'speak (f.sg.)'.
 Possessive adjectives take the form of noun suffixes:  gäza 'house',  gäza-y 'my house',  gäza-ḵi 'your (f.sg.) house'.
 Verbs are based on consonantal roots, most consisting of three consonants: {sbr} 'break',  säbärä 'he broke',  yǝsäbbǝr 'he breaks',  mǝsbar 'to break'.
 Within the tense system there is a basic distinction between the perfective form, conjugated with suffixes and denoting the past, and the imperfective form, conjugated with prefixes and in some cases suffixes, and denoting the present or future:  säbär-u 'they broke',  yǝ-säbr-u 'they break'.
 As in Ge'ez and Amharic, there is also a separate "gerundive" form of the verb, conjugated with suffixes and used to link verbs within a sentence:  gädifka täzaräb 'stop (that) and speak (m.sg.)'.
 Verbs also have a separate jussive/imperative form, similar to the imperfective:  yǝ-sbär-u 'let them break'.
 Through the addition of derivational morphology (internal changes to verb stems and/or prefixes), verbs may be made passive, reflexive, causative, frequentative, reciprocal, or reciprocal causative:  fäläṭ-u 'they knew',  tä-fälṭ-u 'they were known',  a-fälṭ-u 'they caused to know (they introduced)',  tä-faläṭ-u 'they knew each other',  a-f-faläṭ-u 'they caused to know each other'.
 Verbs may take direct object and prepositional pronoun suffixes:  fäläṭä-nni 'he knew me',  fäläṭä-lläy 'he knew for me'.
 Negation is expressed through the prefix ay- and, in independent clauses, the suffix -n:  ay-fäläṭä-n 'he didn't know'.
 The copula and the verb of existence in the present are irregular:  allo 'there is, he exists',  ǝyyu 'he is',  or  yällän or yälbon 'there isn't, he doesn't exist',  aykʷänän 'he isn't',  näbärä 'he existed, he was, there was',  yǝ-ḵäwwǝn 'he will be',  yǝ-näbbǝr 'he will exist, there will be'.
 The verb of existence together with object suffixes for the possessor expresses possession ('have') and obligation ('must'):  allo-nni 'I have, I must' (lit. 'there is (to) me').
 Relative clauses are expressed by a prefix attached to the verb:  zǝ-fäläṭä 'who knew'
 Cleft sentences, with relative clauses normally following the copula, are very common:  män ǝyyu zǝ-fäläṭä 'who knew?' (lit. 'who is he who knew?').
 There is an accusative marker used on definite direct objects. In Tigrinya this is the prefix nǝ-. For example,  ḥagʷäs nǝ’almaz räḵibuwwa 'Hagos met Almaz'.
 As in other modern Ethiopian Semitic languages, the default word order in clauses is subject–object–verb, and noun modifiers usually (though not always in Tigrinya) precede their head nouns.

Innovations 
Tigrinya grammar is unique within the Ethiopian Semitic language family in several ways:
 For second-person pronouns, there is a separate vocative form, used to get a person's attention:  nǝssǝḵa 'you (m.sg.)',  atta 'you! (m.sg.)'.
 There is a definite article, related (as in English) to the demonstrative adjective meaning 'that':  ǝta gʷal 'the girl'.
 The gerundive form is used for past tense, as well as for the linking function as in Ge'ez and Amharic:  täzaribu '(he) speaking, he spoke'.
 Yes-no questions are marked by the particle  do following the questioned word:  ḥaftäydo rǝiḵi 'did you (f.sg.) see my sister?'.
 The negative circumfix ay- -n may mark nouns, pronouns, and adjectives as well as verbs:  ay-anä-n 'not me',  ayabǝy-ǝn 'not big'
 Tigrinya has an unusually complex tense–aspect–mood system, with many nuances achieved using combinations of the three basic aspectual forms (perfect, imperfect, gerundive) and various auxiliary verbs including the copula ( ǝyyu, etc.), the verb of existence ( allo, etc.), and the verbs  näbärä 'exist, live',  konä 'become',  s'änḥe 'stay'.
 Tigrinya has compound prepositions corresponding to the preposition–postposition compounds found in Amharic:  ab lǝli arat 'on (top of) the bed',  ab tǝḥti arat 'under the bed'
 Unlike most Ethiopian Semitic languages, Tigrinya has only one set of applicative suffixes, used both for the dative and benefactive and for locative and adversative senses:  täq̱ämmiṭa-llu 'she sat down for him' or 'she sat down on it' or 'she sat down to his detriment'.

Writing system 
Tigrinya is written in the Geʽez script, originally developed for Geez. The Ethiopic script is an abugida: each symbol represents a consonant+vowel syllable, and the symbols are organized in groups of similar symbols on the basis of both the consonant and the vowel. In the table below the columns are assigned to the seven vowels of Tigrinya; they appear in the traditional order. The rows are assigned to the consonants, again in the traditional order.

For each consonant in an abugida, there is an unmarked symbol representing that consonant followed by a canonical or inherent vowel. For the Ethiopic abugida, this canonical vowel is ä, the first column in the table. However, since the pharyngeal and glottal consonants of Tigrinya (and other Ethiopian Semitic languages) cannot be followed by this vowel, the symbols in the first column for those consonants are pronounced with the vowel a, exactly as in the fourth column. These redundant symbols are falling into disuse in Tigrinya and are shown with a dark gray background in the table. When it is necessary to represent a consonant with no following vowel, the consonant+ə form is used (the symbol in the sixth column). For example, the word ǝntay 'what?' is written , literally ǝ-nǝ-ta-yǝ.

Since some of the distinctions that were apparently made in Ge'ez have been lost in Tigrinya, there are two rows of symbols each for the consonants ‹ḥ›, ‹s›, and ‹sʼ›. In Eritrea, for ‹s› and ‹sʼ›, at least, one of these has fallen into disuse in Tigrinya and is now considered old-fashioned. These less-used series are shown with a dark gray background in the chart.

The orthography does not mark gemination, so the pair of words qärräbä 'he approached', qäräbä 'he was near' are both written . Since such minimal pairs are very rare, this presents no problem to readers of the language.

See also 
 Tig (Tigrinya language)
 UCLA Language Materials Project

References

Bibliography 
 Amanuel Sahle (1998) Säwasäsǝw Tǝgrǝñña bǝsäfiḥ. Lawrencevill, NJ, USA: Red Sea Press. 
 Dan'el Täḵlu Räda (1996, Eth. Cal.) Zäbänawi säwasəw qʷanqʷa Təgrəñña. Mäx'älä
 Rehman, Abdel. English Tigrigna Dictionary: A Dictionary of the Tigrinya Language: (Asmara) Simon Wallenberg Press. Introduction Pages to the Tigrinya Language 
 Eritrean People's Liberation Front (1985) Dictionary, English-Tigrigna-Arabic. Rome: EPLF.
 ----- (1986) Dictionary, Tigrigna-English, mesgebe qalat tigrinya englizenya. Rome: EPLF.
 Kane, Thomas L. (2000) Tigrinya-English Dictionary (2 vols). Springfield, VA: Dunwoody Press. 
 Leslau, Wolf (1941) Documents tigrigna: grammaire et textes. Paris: Libraire C. Klincksieck.
 Mason, John (Ed.) (1996) Säwasǝw Tǝgrǝñña, Tigrinya Grammar. Lawrenceville, NJ, USA: Red Sea Press.  (paperback)
 Praetorius, F. (1871) Grammatik der Tigriñasprache in Abessinien. Halle.  (1974 reprint)
 Täxästä Täxlä et al. (1989, Eth. Cal.) Mäzgäbä Qalat Təgrəñña bə-Təgrəñña. Addis Ababa: Nəgd matämiya dərəǧǧət.
 Ullendorff, E. (1985) A Tigrinya Chrestomathy. Stuttgart: F. Steiner. 
 Ze'im Girma (1983) Lǝsanä Agazi. Asmara: Government Printing Press.

External links 
 Fonts for Geez script:
 Noto Serif Ethiopic (multiple weights and widths)
 Abyssinica SIL (Character set support)

 Tigrigna online, includes an online English-Tigrinya dictionary.
 Tigrinya Translate Beta Version
 Sites with Tigrinya text or sound files (all require a Ge'ez Unicode font).
 Christian recordings in Tigrinya: Global Recordings website.
 Tigrina Learning and Playing Game Board - ]: It provides for playful learning of the Ge'ez script and all languages which are written with it.[http://www.erikids.net'''

 
Fusional languages
Languages of Eritrea
Languages of Ethiopia
South Semitic languages
Subject–object–verb languages